Stepnobugrinsky is a rural locality (a settlement) in 12 let Oktyabrya Selsoviet of Pospelikhinsky District, Altai Krai, Russia. The population was 20 in 2017. There are 3 streets.

Geography 
Stepnobugrinsky is located 60 km south of Pospelikha (the district's administrative centre) by road. Cheburikha is the nearest rural locality.

References 

Rural localities in Pospelikhinsky District